The International Camp on Communication and Computers (ICC) is a non-profit organisation organising annual camps for partially sighted and blind youth in Europe. Every year, the camp is hosted by a different institution (typically schools for the blind or universities) in a European country.

Concept
The idea behind the camp is very simple. It focuses on enhancing the participants' technical and social skills, both of which are of great importance to enable the students being integrated into mainstream education. The usage of IT and AT is highly encouraged and taught in workshops driven by participants' choice. Also, the participants are supported in the process of choosing their future study and get information how to organise it. Besides that, the participants get to build up and strengthen an international network, which serves as a platform for exchange and advice.

Programme
The day typically starts with breakfast at 7.30 am. Workshops are held in the morning (9.00 am - 12.00 pm) and afternoon (2.00 pm - 5.00 pm). During the workshops, there are small coffee breaks. In the evening, there are different leisure time activities, as well as the opportunity to go to the city.
The participants are basically responsible for themselves, although there are always staff members and volunteers ready to help.
There's always an excursion day, on which all the participants can discover a special place near the host.

The workshops deal with every aspect of the participants' lives. While there workshops dealing with general life skills, social issues and culture, there are others dealing with specific software (e.g. JAWS).

Leisure time activities may differ on the host and its environment. They can again range from crafting to sightseeing.

History
The efforts to support blind and partially sighted students at the universities of Linz and Karlsruhe led to considerations on how to support the transition from school to university. These considerations encouraged founders Klaus Miesenberger and Joachim Klaus to make up a concept to get in touch with possible students at an early stage.
To get some experiences, there was a national computer camp in Austria in 1993.

Camps and locations
Since 1993, the camp took place in various European countries and brought together about 1700 participants and 1300 staff members.

 1st Integrating Computer Camp 1993, Graz, Austria
 1st International Computer Camp 1994, Graz & Linz, Austria
 2nd International Computer Camp 1995, Graz & Linz, Austria
 3rd International Computer Camp 1996, Graz & Linz, Austria
 4th International Computer Camp 1997, Zeist, Netherlands
 5th International Computer Camp 1998, Villeurbanne and Clermont-Ferrand, France
 6th International Computer Camp 1999, Stockholm, Sweden
 7th International Computer Camp 2000, Stuttgart, Germany
 8th International Computer Camp 2001, Skofja Loka, Slovenia
 9th International Computer Camp 2002, Loughborough, United Kingdom
 10th International Computer Camp 2003, Zollikofen, Switzerland
 11th International Computer Camp 2004, Budapest, Hungary
 12th International Camp on Communication and Computers 2005, Brno, Czech Republic
 13th International Camp on Communication and Computers 2006, Königs Wusterhausen, Germany
 14th International Camp on Communication and Computers 2007, Espoo, Finland
 15th International Camp on Communication and Computers 2009, Vienna, Austria
 16th International Camp on Communication and Computers 2010, Nea Erithrea, Athens, Greece
 17th International Camp on Communication and Computers 2011, Florence and Ferrara, Italy
 18th International Camp on Communication and Computers 2012, Cluj-Napoca, Romania
 19th International Camp on Communication and Computers 2013, Telč, Czech Republic
 20th International Camp on Communication and Computers 2014, Riga, Latvia
 21st International Camp on Communication and Computers 2015, Zeist, the Netherlands
 22nd International Camp on Communication and Computers 2016, Dresden, Germany
 23rd International Camp on Communication and Computers 2017, Leuven, Belgium
 24th International Camp on Communication and Computers 2018, Zadar, Croatia
 25th International Camp on Communication and Computers 2019, Hereford, United Kingdom
 The International Camp 2020 did not happen due to COVID-19, it was going to be in Avero, Portugal
 26th International Camp on Communication and Computers 2021, was held digitally. 
 27th International Camp on Communication and Computers 2022, was held digitally 

In 2023, the ICC takes place in the Czech Republic, .

References

External links

Blindness organisations in Austria
International organisations based in Austria